The Man Who Lost Himself may refer to:

 The Man Who Lost Himself, a 1918 novel by Henry De Vere Stacpoole
 The Man Who Lost Himself (1920 film), a lost adaptation
 The Man Who Lost Himself (1941 film), another adaptation, starring Brian Aherne and Kay Francis